The  Washington Redskins season was the franchise's 69th season in the National Football League (NFL) and their 64th in Washington, D.C. Owner Dan Snyder made a offseason splash by signing Bruce Smith, Deion Sanders and Jeff George in a bid to win Super Bowl XXXV in Tampa. Heavily favored to represent the NFC at Super Bowl XXXV and win it, they failed to improve on their 10–6 record from 1999 and they went 8-8 and missed the playoffs despite starting the season 6-2.

Norv Turner, in his sixth season as the Redskins head coach, was fired the day after Week 14, in which they went 7-6. He was replaced by Terry Robiskie for the final two games.

The off-season dominated when owner Dan Snyder acquired veteran free agents Bruce Smith, Deion Sanders and Mark Carrier. Smith would remain with the Redskins until 2003 while both Carrier and Sanders left the team at the end of the season, though Sanders returned to play for the Baltimore Ravens in 2004.

The season is notable for the Redskins drafting future Pro Bowlers Lavar Arrington and Chris Samuels with the second and third overall picks respectively in the first round of the 2000 NFL Draft.

Offseason

NFL draft

Personnel

Staff

Roster

Preseason

Regular season

Schedule

Standings

Best performances 
 Marco Coleman, Week 1, 2.5 Quarterback Sacks vs. Carolina Panthers 
 Marco Coleman, Week 5, 3.0 Quarterback Sacks vs. Tampa Bay Buccaneers 
 Albert Connell, 3rd Best Receiving Performance of Season, 211 Receiving Yards vs. Jacksonville Jaguars, October 22 
 Bruce Smith, Week 12, 3.0 Quarterback Sacks vs. St. Louis Rams

Player stats

Passing

Rushing

Receiving

Sacks

Awards and records 
 LaVar Arrington, PFW/Pro Football Writers of America All-Rookie Team
 Marco Coleman, NFC Defensive Player of the Week, week 5 
 Albert Connell, NFC Offensive Player of the Week, week 8 
 Deion Sanders, NFL Defensive Player of the Week, week 5
 Chris Samuels, PFW/Pro Football Writers of America All-Rookie Team
 Bruce Smith, NFC Defensive Player of the Week, week 12

References

External links 
 Redskins on Pro Football Reference
 2000 NFC Passing Stats

Washington
Washington Redskins seasons
Washington Redskins